David Katz (June 28, 1924 – 1987) was an American conductor who founded the Queens Symphony Orchestra (QSO) in 1953, which he conducted until he died of cancer in 1987.

Early life and education 
Katz was born in Mishawaka, Indiana. He graduated from the Juilliard School of Music and moved to Forest Hills, Queens with his wife, Jeanne.

Career
During the 1970s, the Queens Symphony Orchestra joined the union and became the first and only professional orchestra in Queens. At this time, QSO was affiliated with the American Symphony Orchestra League and Forest Hills Community Center. David Katz was discovered by Leopold Stokowski, who he joined as associate conductor of The American Symphony Orchestra (ASO). Katz conducted the ASO at Carnegie Hall from 1961 till 1970. He also conducted the Oratorio Society of Queens from 1968 to 1969, succeeding Lawrence Rasmussen. and later conducted the Tokyo Symphony Orchestra in 1971.

By QSO's second season, children's concerts were added to the schedule, leading to David and Jeannie starting the Music BAG Program (Music for Boys and Girls). This program was designed to get kids involved with making music with the orchestra, and learning the history and theory of music. By the 1970s, the BAG Program was reaching over 17,000 school children annually throughout Queens supported by Macy’s and the Long Island Press 

In 1969, Katz and his wife Jeanne Dale Katz founded Long Lake Camp for the Arts a summer camp in Long Lake, New York. Today, David Katz's son, Marc Katz and Susan Katz operate the camp.

Personal life
David and Jeanne had four children: Mathew, Michael, Marc and Melinda. Jeannie Katz also founded the Queens Council on the Arts in 1966, which helps promote and develop the arts in the county of Queens, New York. In recognition of his work with the orchestra, David Katz received the Mayor's Award of Honor for Arts and Culture from Mayor Ed Koch in 1982.

References

1924 births
1987 deaths
People from Mishawaka, Indiana
American male conductors (music)
Deaths from cancer in New York (state)
Musicians from Indiana
Musicians from Queens, New York
Juilliard School alumni
20th-century American conductors (music)
Classical musicians from New York (state)
20th-century American male musicians